Mario Andrés Valdéz Aguilar (born April 7, 1992, in Tijuana, Baja California) is a Mexican professional footballer who currently plays for Correcaminos UAT.

References

Living people
1992 births
Mexican footballers
Association football defenders
San Luis F.C. players
Irapuato F.C. footballers
C.D. Tepatitlán de Morelos players
Correcaminos UAT footballers
Murciélagos FC footballers
Ascenso MX players
Liga Premier de México players
Tercera División de México players
Footballers from Baja California
Sportspeople from Tijuana